The 2009 ICC Awards were held on 1 October 2009 in Johannesburg, South Africa before the semi-finals of 2009 ICC Champions Trophy. Nominations were announced in Mumbai in early September while short lists were announced on 15 September. These awards were given on the performance of the players between 13 August 2008 and 24 August 2009 and were presented in association with the Federation of International Cricketers' Associations (FICA). Performances from both players and officials were taken into account during this period of time for the game.

The ICC had been hosting ICC Awards since 2004, which were now into their sixth year. Previous events were held in London (2004), Sydney (2005), Mumbai (2006) and Dubai (2008), with Johannesburg also hosting in 2007. The ICC awards the Sir Garfield Sobers Trophy to the Cricketer of the Year, which is considered to be the most prestigious award in world cricket.

Sponsors
As the logo of these awards suggests, LG, one of the world's leading electronic brands, sponsored these awards along with other ICC sponsors.

Selection Committee
Chaired by ICC Cricket Hall of Famer Clive Lloyd, the ICC Selection Committee was charged with two main tasks. Using their experience, knowledge and appreciation of the game, they selected the ICC World XI Teams and provided a long list of nominations to the 25 members of the voting academy to cast their votes in the individual player award categories.

Selection Committee members:

 Clive Lloyd (chairman)
 Anil Kumble
 Mudassar Nazar
 Stephen Fleming
 Bob Taylor

Award categories and winners

Cricketer of the Year

 Mitchell Johnson

Test Player of the Year

 Gautam Gambhir

ODI Player of the Year

 MS Dhoni

Twenty20 International Performance of the Year
 Tillakaratne Dilshan, for scoring 96 not out off 57 deliveries against the West Indies in the semi-final of the 2009 ICC World Twenty20 at The Oval on 19 June 2009

Emerging Player of the Year

 Peter Siddle

Associate Player of the Year
 William Porterfield

Umpire of the Year

 Aleem Dar

Women's Cricketer of the Year

 Claire Taylor

Spirit of Cricket

ICC World XI Teams

ICC Test Team of the Year

MS Dhoni was selected as both captain and wicket-keeper of the Test Team of the Year. Other players are:

 Gautam Gambhir
 Andrew Strauss
 AB de Villiers
 Sachin Tendulkar
 Thilan Samaraweera
 Michael Clarke
 MS Dhoni
 Shakib Al Hasan
 Mitchell Johnson
 Stuart Broad
 Dale Steyn
 Harbhajan Singh (12th man)

ICC ODI Team of the Year

MS Dhoni was also selected as both captain and wicket-keeper of the ODI Team of the Year. Other players are:

 Virender Sehwag
 Chris Gayle
 Kevin Pietersen
 Tillakaratne Dilshan
 Yuvraj Singh
 Martin Guptill
 MS Dhoni
 Andrew Flintoff
 Nuwan Kulasekara
 Ajantha Mendis
 Umar Gul
 Thilan Thushara (12th man)

Short lists
The short lists for the 2009 ICC Awards were announced by the ICC on 15 September 2009 directly from Dubai. They are the following:

Cricketer of the Year
 MS Dhoni
 Gautam Gambhir
 Mitchell Johnson
 Andrew Strauss

Test Player of the Year
 Gautam Gambhir
 Mitchell Johnson
 Thilan Samaraweera
 Andrew Strauss

ODI Player of the Year
 Shivnarine Chanderpaul
 MS Dhoni
 Virender Sehwag
 Yuvraj Singh

Twenty20 International Performance of the Year
 Shahid Afridi
 Tillakaratne Dilshan
 Chris Gayle
 Umar Gul

Emerging Player of the Year
 Ben Hilfenhaus
 Graham Onions
 Jesse Ryder
 Peter Siddle

Associate Player of the Year
 Rizwan Cheema
 Ryan ten Doeschate
 William Porterfield
 Edgar Schiferli

Umpire of the Year
 Aleem Dar
 Tony Hill
 Asad Rauf
 Simon Taufel

Women's Cricketer of the Year
 Charlotte Edwards
 Shelley Nitschke
 Claire Taylor

Spirit of Cricket

 New Zealand

Nominations
The following are the nominations for the 2009 ICC Awards in different categories. They were announced by Virender Sehwag and Ravi Shastri in the presence of ICC CEO Haroon Lorgat.

Cricketer of the Year
 Shivnarine Chanderpaul
 Tillakaratne Dilshan
 MS Dhoni
 Gautam Gambhir
 Shakib Al Hasan
 Mitchell Johnson
 Graham Onions
 Thilan Samaraweera
 Kumar Sangakkara
 Harbhajan Singh
 Andrew Strauss
 Daniel Vettori
 AB de Villiers

Test Player of the Year
 Stuart Broad
 Michael Clarke
 MS Dhoni
 Tillakaratne Dilshan
 Gautam Gambhir
 Shakib Al Hasan
 Mitchell Johnson
 V.V.S. Laxman
 Jesse Ryder
 Thilan Samaraweera
 Ramnaresh Sarwan
 Peter Siddle
 Harbhajan Singh
 Graeme Smith
 Dale Steyn
 Andrew Strauss
 Graeme Swann
 Daniel Vettori
 AB de Villiers

ODI Player of the Year
 Shivnarine Chanderpaul
 MS Dhoni
 Andrew Flintoff
 Chris Gayle
 Umar Gul
 Martin Guptill
 Michael Hussey
 Nuwan Kulasekara
 Ajantha Mendis
 Muttiah Muralitharan
 Yuvraj Singh
 Virender Sehwag
 Thilan Thushara

Twenty20 International Performance of the Year
 Shahid Afridi
 Saeed Ajmal
 Dwayne Bravo
 Alex Cusack
 Tillakaratne Dilshan
 Chris Gayle
 Umar Gul
 David Hussey
 Sanath Jayasuriya
 Zaheer Khan
 Ajantha Mendis
 Wayne Parnell
 Abdur Razzak
 David Warner

Emerging Player of the Year
 Martin Guptill
 Ben Hilfenhaus
 Phillip Hughes
 Amit Mishra
 Graham Onions
 Kemar Roach
 Jesse Ryder
 Peter Siddle

Associate Player of the Year
 Rizwan Cheema
 Khurram Chohan
 Alex Cusack
 Ryan ten Doeschate
 Trent Johnston
 Neil McCallum
 Kevin O'Brien
 Niall O'Brien
 William Porterfield
 Boyd Rankin
 Edgar Schiferli
 Steve Tikolo
 Regan West
 Bas Zuiderent

Umpire of the Year
 Billy Bowden
 Aleem Dar
 Steve Davis
 Ian Gould
 Tony Hill
 Daryl Harper
 Asad Rauf
 Simon Taufel

Women's Cricketer of the Year

 Suzie Bates
 Holly Colvin
 Charlotte Edwards
 Laura Marsh
 Sana Mir
 Shelley Nitschke
 Mithali Raj
 Karen Rolton
 Priyanka Roy
 Lisa Sthalekar
 Claire Taylor
 Sarah Taylor
 Stafanie Taylor
 Haidee Tiffen
 Aimee Watkins

See also

 International Cricket Council
 ICC Awards
 Sir Garfield Sobers Trophy (Cricketer of the Year)
 ICC Test Player of the Year
 ICC ODI Player of the Year
 David Shepherd Trophy (Umpire of the Year)
 ICC Women's Cricketer of the Year
 ICC Test Team of the Year
 ICC ODI Team of the Year

References

External links
Official website of the ICC
Awards 2009 Winners

International Cricket Council awards and rankings
Crick
2009 in cricket